Drohmo (also known as Drohmo Ri) is a multi-peaked mountain located at  in Eastern Nepal.

Location 
Drohmo is located in Janak mountain range in Eastern Nepal Mountain Range. The peak is 3.5km north east of Tengkoma, 5.4km south of Janak Chuli on Nepal China border, and 7.8km west of Pathibhara Chuli.

Climbing history 
Drohmo was first attempted by a Swiss team in 1949, but they were unsuccessful. Till date, no one has summited the main Drohmo peak. However, the central summit was first climbed in 1998 by Doug Scott and Roger Mear via the south pillar. Another ascent of the central summit in 2002 was successfully executed by the Slovene Aleš Koželj and Mitja Šorn but they took a different route via the south pillar.

References 

Mountains of Nepal
Six-thousanders of the Himalayas
Mountains of Koshi Province